The 2005 Indoor Pan American Cup was the third edition of the Indoor Pan American Cup. It were held from 9 to 11 December 2005 in Kitchener, Canada. Five teams competed in the men's tournament while four teams competed in the women's tournaments. Canada (men and women) and Trinidad & Tobago (men) were qualified for the 2007 Men's and Women's Hockey World Cup.

All times are local (UTC−04:00).

Results

Pool matches

First to fourth place classification

Semi-finals

Third and fourth place

Final

Final standings

See also
2005 Women's Indoor Pan American Cup

References

Indoor Pan American Cup
Men's Indoor Pan American Cup
International field hockey competitions hosted by Canada
Indoor Pan American Cup
Sport in Kitchener, Ontario
Pan American Cup